Maria Branco (15 March 1842, Horta, Faial, Azores – 3 November 1887, Horta, Faial, Azores), became the most well-known Dabney's family midwife during their stay in Horta, Faial, Azores, for her expertise in difficult birth cases.

Biography
Ever since her grandparents, the Branco family worked for the estate of the North American entrepreneur John Dabney, established in the island since 1808.

Her father, Manuel Branco, was a longshoreman who spent his days loading crates of oranges, while her mother, Josefa Branco, worked as a housemaid at The Cedars mansion. This provided Maria with a privileged childhood for her social status, as she was given the chance of spending time with the family's children.

Instead of following in her mother footsteps, she started from a young age to attend the neighborhood  births. Having assisted various types of labors, she quickly became an expert at solving complex cases. She stood out for her ability to keep mother and children healthy.

See also
Midwife
Horta
Faial
Azores

References

1842 births
1887 deaths